The Marly series is a series of twenty oil on canvas paintings by Alfred Sisley of the town of Marly-Le-Roi. Sisley lived in the town from his return from a painting trip to England at the end of 1874 until he moved to live in Sèvres in August 1877.

List

References

Painting series